Yohann Rangdet (born 3 July 1980 in Sèvres) is a French football coach and former professional player. He works as a youth coach at Racing Besançon.

He played on the professional level in Ligue 2 for Le Mans Union Club 72 and US Créteil-Lusitanos.

References

1980 births
Living people
People from Sèvres
Footballers from Hauts-de-Seine
Association football forwards
French footballers
Ligue 2 players
Red Star F.C. players
Le Mans FC players
US Créteil-Lusitanos players
Entente SSG players
Angers SCO players
Racing Besançon players
SR Colmar players
US Raon-l'Étape players